Farrukh Sayfiev  (born 17 January 1991) is an Uzbekistani professional footballer who plays as a midfielder for Nasaf.

International goals
Scores and results list Uzbekistan's goal tally first.

References

External links
 
 

1991 births
Living people
Uzbekistani footballers
Uzbekistan international footballers
Association football midfielders
FC Nasaf players
2015 AFC Asian Cup players
Footballers at the 2014 Asian Games
2019 AFC Asian Cup players
Asian Games competitors for Uzbekistan